Claude Mauriac (25 April 1914 – 22 March 1996) was a French author and journalist. He was born in Paris, the eldest son of the author François Mauriac.

Mauriac was the personal secretary of Charles de Gaulle from 1944 to 1949, before becoming a cinema critic and arts person of Le Figaro. He was the author of several novels and essays, and co-scripted the movie adaptation of his father's novel Thérèse Desqueyroux. He also wrote a study of the novelist Marcel Proust, his wife's great-uncle. Mauriac was also a close friend of French philosopher Michel Foucault.

Bibliography

Journals 
Le Temps immobile
Le Temps immobile 1, Grasset, 1974 ; Le Livre de Poche, 1983
Le Temps immobile 2 (Les Espaces imaginaires), Grasset, 1975 ; Le Livre de Poche, 1985
Le Temps immobile 3 (Et comme l'espérance est violente), Grasset, 1976 ; Le Livre de Poche, 1986
Le Temps immobile 4 (La Terrasse de Malagar), Grasset, 1977 ; Le Livre de Poche, 1987
Le Temps immobile 5 (Aimer de Gaulle), Grasset, 1978 ; Le Livre de Poche, 1988
Le Temps immobile 6 (Le Rire des pères dans les yeux des enfants), Grasset, 1981 ; Le Livre de Poche, 1989
Le Temps immobile 7 (Signes, rencontres et rendez-vous), Grasset, 1983 ; Le Livre de Poche, 1990
Le Temps immobile 8 (Bergère ô tour Eiffel), Grasset, 1985 ; Le Livre de Poche, 1991
Le Temps immobile 9 (Mauriac et fils), Grasset, 1986 ; Le Livre de Poche, 1992
Le Temps immobile 10 (L'Oncle Marcel), Grasset, 1988 ; Le Livre de Poche, 1993
Conversations avec André Gide, Albin Michel, 1951 ; nouvelle édition revue et augmentée, 1990
Une amitié contrariée, Grasset, 1970
Une certaine rage, Robert Laffont, 1977
L'Éternité parfois, Pierre Belfond, 1978
Laurent Terzieff, Stock, 1980
Qui peut le dire ?, L'Âge d'Homme, 1985
Le Temps accompli
Le Temps accompli 1, Grasset, 1991
Le Temps accompli 2 (Histoire de ne pas oublier. Journal 1938), Grasset, 1992
Le Temps accompli 3 (Le Pont du secret), Grasset, 1993
Le Temps accompli 4 (Travaillez quand vous avez encore la lumière), posthume, Grasset, 1996

Novels 
Le Dialogue intérieur
Toutes les femmes sont fatales, Albin Michel, 1957 ; Le Livre de Poche, 1971
Le Dîner en ville, Albin Michel, 1959 ; Le Livre de Poche, 1973 ; Folio, 1985 (Prix Médicis 1959)
La Marquise sortit à cinq heures, Albin Michel, 1961 ; Folio, 1984
L'Agrandissement, Albin Michel, 1963
Les Infiltrations de l'invisible
L'Oubli, Grasset, 1966
Le Bouddha s'est mis à trembler, Grasset, 1979
Un cœur tout neuf, Grasset, 1980
Radio Nuit, Grasset, 1982
Zabé, Gallimard, 1984 ; Folio, 1993
Trans-Amour-Étoiles, Grasset, 1989
Journal d'une ombre, Sables, 1992
sous le pseudonyme de Harriet Pergoline
Le Fauteuil Rouge, Flammarion, 1990

Plays 
La Conversation, Grasset, 1964.
Théâtre (La Conversation ; Ici, maintenant ; Le Cirque ; Les Parisiens du dimanche ; Le Hun), Grasset, 1968

Essays 
Introduction à une mystique de l'enfer, Grasset, 1938
Jean Cocteau ou la Vérité du mensonge, Odette Lieutier, 1945
Aimer Balzac, La Table Ronde, 1945
La Trahison d'un clerc, La Table Ronde, 1945
Malraux ou le mal du héros, Grasset, 1946
André Breton, Éditions de Flore, 1949 ; Grasset, 1970 (Prix Sainte-Beuve 1949)
Marcel Proust par lui-même, Collections Microcosme "Écrivains de toujours", Le Seuil, 1953
Hommes et idées d'aujourd'hui, Albin Michel, 1953
L'Amour du cinéma, Albin Michel, 1954
Petite littérature du cinéma, Le Cerf, 1957
L'Alittérature contemporaine, Albin Michel, 1958 et 1969
De la littérature à l'alittérature, Grasset, 1969
Quand le temps était mobile, Bartillat, 2008

References

External links 

The Claude Mauriac website

1914 births
1996 deaths
Writers from Paris
Prix Sainte-Beuve winners
20th-century French journalists
French film critics
Prix Médicis winners
Burials at Montparnasse Cemetery
French male non-fiction writers
Commandeurs of the Ordre des Arts et des Lettres
20th-century French male writers